Patrick Egan,  (20 July 1923 – 9 July 2016) was an Irish Catholic (Redemptorist) priest, notable for being in charge of the Men's Confraternity in Clonard Monastery, Belfast, when the "Troubles" broke out in August 1969. He anointed those who were shot that day and tried to stop a potential massacre of Catholics by calling in British troops. Egan spent much of his time working as a priest in the Gaeltacht areas of the west of Ireland. He was a first cousin of Monsignor Brian Egan.

Early life 
Patrick Egan was born in Carrowbeg, County Mayo, on 20 July 1923, to Daniel Egan (1888 – 1986) and Mary Conway (1882 – 1966). His father was a farmer. Patrick grew up as the youngest of five children. He was professed as a Redemptorist on 3 October 1947 in Dundalk, County Louth, and he was ordained a priest on 27 August 1950, in Cluain Mhuire, County Galway.

The Troubles 
Egan was in charge of the Men's Confraternity in Clonard Monastery, Belfast, when the "Troubles" broke out. Between 12 and 16 August 1969, there was an outbreak of political and sectarian violence in Northern Ireland. Civil rights marches, demanding an end to discrimination against Catholics and Irish nationalists, had been repeatedly attacked by Ulster Protestant loyalists and also came into frequent conflict with the Royal Ulster Constabulary (RUC), the overwhelmingly Protestant police force.

On the night of 14 August 1969, an attack on Clonard Monastery by loyalist mobs begun. Around an hour and a half later, shots rang out from the loyalist side. Fiann Gerald McAuley, only fifteen years old, was shot, and later died. He was anointed where he fell by Egan. who had been watching events unfold from the upstairs window in the Monastery. He would anoint four others within the next hour. Fearing a massacre, he attempted to contact the British Army's general officer commanding (GOC) to request the presence of troops to deter more violence. When the first British soldiers reached Falls Road at 7 pm, Egan tried to persuade their commanding officer to move into the Clonard area, but he declined, as the soldiers had other orders. Many nearby streets had been set on fire by the loyalists.

In the aftermath of the burning of nearby Bombay Street, hundreds of members of the local community gathered in the church of Clonard Monastery, where Egan delivered a sermon to the Men's Confraternity on the violence he had witnessed and on his hope that peace could be restored. Transcripts and audio recordings of this sermon exist today.

Later life 
Egan spent much of his life working as a priest in the Gaeltacht areas of County Galway. He also gave retreats in the now infamous St Joseph's Industrial School, Letterfrack. Egan lived at his sister Kay Egan's (1918-2013) home on the family farm in Carrowbeg, County Mayo, and the Redemptorist community in Esker, County Galway.

Death 
Egan passed away on 9 July 2016 at University Hospital Galway at around 5 pm. He was 92 years old.

Notes

External links 
 Fr Patrick Egan's sermon to the Men's Confraternity in Clonard Monastery in 1969.
 Transcript of Fr Patrick Egan's sermon to the Men's Confraternity in Clonard Monastery in 1969.
 "The Clonard Pogrom, 1969"

1923 births
2016 deaths
People from County Mayo
20th-century Irish Roman Catholic priests